Christianity is a minority religion in the Maldives. The Maldives are among the countries with the least tolerance towards Christians. According to the former President Maumoon Abdul Gayoom, no religion other than Islam should be allowed in the Maldives. Public practise of the Christian religion is prohibited. In 2013, scholar Felix Wilfred of Oxford University estimates the number of Christians in Maldives as 1,400 or 0.4% of the country's population.

In the late 1990s, the Supreme Council for Islamic Affairs warned people that they would face arrest if they listened to radio programmes broadcast in the Dhivehi language by the Far East Broadcasting Association, based in the Seychelles. In 1998, 50 Maldivian Christians were arrested and held on the prison island of Dhoonidhoo, and Christian foreigners who were suspected of missionary work were also expelled from the country.

The Church of South India, the Evangelical Mennonite Church and the Seventh-day Adventists are present in this country. Roman Catholics in the Maldives are covered by the Archdiocese of Colombo. The Annals of the Propagation of the Faith mentions that in 1833 after the consecration of Clément Bonnand as the Vicar Apostolic of Pondicherry, he was authorized by the Holy See to send missionaries to the Maldive Islands where the Christian faith has not reached.

Citizens of the Maldives who attempt to convert to Christianity automatically lose their citizenship. President Maumoon Abdul Gayoom stated that the Maldives would be deprived of independence if it is not entirely Muslim. The Maldivian High Commission in Colombo stated in 1998, that reports of persecution are inaccurate and wrong.

History 
The arrival of the Portuguese also saw the appearance of Christianity in the region. In 1558 the Portuguese established a small garrison with a Viador (Viyazoru), or overseer of a factory (trading post) in the Maldives, which they administered from their main colony in Goa. They tried to impose Christianity on the locals and some of the nobility were converted. After a local leader repelled the Portuguese, Christianity receded. The Dutch nominally controlled the region in the mid-17th century then the British in the last years of the 17th century. However, the Dutch and British did not interfere with the religious beliefs of the locals. Today, Christianity in the Maldives is mainly practiced by tourists and temporary workers.

See also 

Roman Catholicism in the Maldives

Filipinos in the Maldives

References

Online sources 
opendoorsusa.org
aaa.net.au
persecution.net
UN